Erie Freighthouse Historic District is a national historic district located at Bath in Steuben County, New York. It is composed of all or portions of seven properties (six contributing buildings), including the former Erie Railroad freighthouse, various buildings for the sale or storage of agricultural goods, and the former Bath Harnass Company factory.

It was listed on the National Register of Historic Places in 1991.

References

Historic districts on the National Register of Historic Places in New York (state)
Erie Railroad
Historic districts in Steuben County, New York
National Register of Historic Places in Steuben County, New York
Railway freight houses on the National Register of Historic Places in New York (state)